Samsons is a pop-rock band formed in Jakarta, Indonesia, in 2003. As of 2022, the band currently comprises Adrian Martadinata (vocals), Irfan Aulia (guitar), Erik Partogi Siagian (guitar), and Aldri Dataviadi (bass).

Samsons are known for their orchestral musical arrangements and for their anthemic singles, including "Naluri Lelaki", "Kenangan Terindah", "Bukan Diriku", "Akhir Rasa Ini", "Di Penghujung Muda", "Luluh", "Kisah Tak Sempurna", "Hey Gadis", "Seandainya", "Tak Bisa Memiliki", "Hening", "Tak Ada Tempat Seperti Surga", and "Masih (Mencintainya)".

History

2005–2007: Naluri Lelaki 
The first album titled Naluri Lelaki, released on 25 November 2005, was a major success for their debut in music industry. It achieved multi-platinum awards for record sales, as well as winning various award categories at Anugerah Musik Indonesia (Indonesian Music Awards) in 2006. The categories include Best Newcomer, Best Group/Duo, Best Song (Kenangan Terindah), Best Album (Naluri Lelaki), and RBT (Ring Back Tone) Award. Popular singles from Naluri Lelaki are as follows; Naluri Lelaki, Bukan Diriku, Akhir Rasa Ini, Kenangan Terindah, and Di Penghujung Muda. During its heyday, this song occupied the first position on the MTV Ampuh chart from Agustus 2005 to December 2005.

2007–2008: Penantian Hidup 
The second album Penantian Hidup released on May 25, 2007, produced in three countries (Indonesia, Australia, and United States). In this album, for the first time Samsons worked with an overseas orchestra group called Sydney Philharmonic Orchestra, which contains 55 of Australia's best musicians, playing an orchestra arrangement written by Erwin Gutawa. Penantian Hidup was mixed by a senior mixing engineer from Australia, Guy Grey in Singsing Studio, Melbourne. The mastering session Penantian Hidup took place in Sterling Sound, New York. Mastered by Ted Jensen, an American mastering engineer, whose has mastered for The Eagles (Hotel California), Green Day (American Idiot) and Norah Jones (Come Away With Me). Hits from Penantian Hidup include "Kisah Tak Sempurna", "Luluh", "Seandainya" and "For You".

In celebration of the sales for Penantian Hidup reaching platinum status, in Samsons released an extended version of the album in 2008, named Penantian Hidup: Platinum Edition. Samsons also dedicate the album to Samsonia, a term for supportive and loyal Samsons fans. The Platinum Edition album contains the eleven songs included on Penantian Hidup, plus three new songs titled "Tak Bisa Memiliki", "Hening" and "Devil's Box".

2009–2013: Samsons and Bams' departure 
In 2009, Samsons released their third, self-titled album, SAMSONS. The album was produced in Aquarius Studio, Jakarta, and recorded using the analog system - this due in part to Samsons' distaste towards recording as an art fading away. SAMSONS popular singles include "Tak Ada Tempat Seperti Surga", "Masih (Mencintainya)" and "Percuma".

2013–2016: Perihal Besar and Aria Dinata 
In 2013, they released their fourth album Perihal Besar, featured the hit ballad "Di Ujung Jalan". This album is a debut for the new frontman, Ariadinata, who joined Samsons in 2012 after the first vocalist, Bams, decided to split from the band in the late 2010. Beside "Di Ujung Jalan", Perihal Besar also has some other hits, like "Langit Runtuh", "Lara" and "Indonesia (Bersatulah!)".

2016–2021: V and the departure of Konde and Aria 
In late 2016, Samsons released their single, "I Love You". The song is a lead single from their fifth album. The song was inspired from the birth moment of Irfan Aulia's daughter. In this song, Irfan talks about the feelings of love at first sight, from the view of a father to his daughter. Not leaving their trademark in music, in this song Samsons back with an epic orchestral arrangements. This time, they had the opportunity to work together with the Budapest Scoring Symphony Orchestra. The Orchestra consist a 55-member classical musician based in Budapest, who plays an orchestra arrangement written by Irfan himself.

In 2017, Samsons returned with their single, "Cinta Mati". It is a ballad piece with the theme of love, off of their upcoming fifth album. The song was written by Irfan Aulia in 2012. Before being performed by Samsons, "Cinta Mati" was originally released and sung by Marcell Siahaan in 2015. Samsons performed the song with a new arrangement. Similar to "I Love You", in "Cinta Mati" Samsons worked with the Budapest Scoring Symphony Orchestra for the rearrangement of "Cinta Mati". The Orchestra included 55 orchestra players in total, with 40 strings players, 7 woodwind players, 7 brass players, and 1 percussionist with a background in performing for movie scores.

Orchestral sound also appeared in Samsons' discography in 2007 on the album Penantian Hidup, where they collaborated with the Sydney Philharmonic Orchestra.

On 18 December 2020, the band released their fifth album titled V ("five" in the Roman numerals) that contained twelve songs, three of which were singles released prior to Kondwe's departure ("I Love You", "Cinta Mati" and "Tuhan Tak Pernah Salah"), but do not include "Electrify My Soul" that released on 22 November 2019. The last single of the album, titled "Jika Nanti" also released on the aforementioned day. V was the band's last album with Aria Dinata as a vocalist.

2022–present: Adrian Martadinata joins 
On 5 March 2022, the Samsons announced that Adrian Martadinata would become their new vocalist. Samsons were famillar with Maradinata since 2008. Irfan admits that Samsons wanted to hire the Martadinata, not just as a singer, but to also contribute otherwise via production. Irfan remarked Martadinata as a great "single maker". Martadinata said that Samsons is a well-known band to him, and that contributing to production - not just vocals - was his own desire as well. However, he did not accept the initial offer from Irfan, instead asking him, "why choose [me] instead find the younger one"?. Martadinata stated that Irfan's response was that he "wants to find a bandmate [he] can get along and have a lot of fun with". Martadinata became an official member of Samsons and the band subsequently released two new singles: "Rayu" on 25 March and "Rasa yang Salah" on 9 September 2022.

Discography 
 Naluri Lelaki (2005)
 Penantian Hidup (2007)
 Penantian Hidup Platinum Edition (2008)
 Samsons (2009)
 Perihal Besar (2013)
 V'' (2020)

Band members

Current 
 Adrian Martadinata – lead vocals (2022–present)
 Erik Partogi Siagian – guitars (2003–present)
 Irfan Aulia – guitars, backing vocals (2003–present)
 Aldri Dataviadi – bass (2003–present)

Past 
 Bams (Bambang Reguna Bukit) – lead vocals (2003–2012)
 Konde (Chandra Christanto) – drums (2003–2019)
 Aria Dinata – lead vocals (2013–2021)

Additional 
 Yessi Kristianto – keyboard
 Henrico Octaviano - drum

References

External links 
 Official Instagram Account

Musical groups established in 2003
Indonesian pop music groups
Indonesian rock music groups
2003 establishments in Indonesia
Anugerah Musik Indonesia winners